Ureña or Urena may refer to:

Urena, a genus of plants
Urena lobata
Ureña, Táchira, a community in Táchira State, Venezuela
Ureña SC, a football club in the Venezuelan Primera División, based in Ureña, Táchira
Count of Ureña, a Spanish noble title

Surname
Camila Henríquez Ureña (1894–1973), Dominican writer, daughter of Salomé Ureña
Francisco Urena, American politician
Gerardo Ureña (born 1955), Costa Rican footballer and manager
Jorge Ureña (born 1993), Spanish athlete
José Rafael Molina Ureña (1921–2000), Dominican politician
José Ureña (born 1991), Dominican baseball player
Juan Antonio Ureña (born 1967), Spanish footballer
Julian Scott Urena, Dominican actor
Leopoldo Alas y Ureña (1852–1901), Spanish novelist
Marco Ureña (born 1990), Costa Rican footballer
Pedro Henríquez Ureña (1884–1946), Dominican writer
Rafael Estrella Ureña (1889–1945), Dominican politician and lawyer
Richard Ureña (born 1996), Dominican baseball player
Rodrigo Ureña (born 1993), Chilean footballer
Salomé Ureña (1850–1897), Dominican writer

Spanish-language surnames